Thomas Lebas (born 14 December 1985) is a French cyclist, who currently rides for UCI Continental team .

Major results

2007
 8th Overall Tour des Pyrénées
2008
 9th Overall Tour de Gironde
2011
 4th Overall Giro della Regione Friuli Venezia Giulia
 6th Overall Mi-Août en Bretagne
 6th Overall Tour de Serbie
 8th Overall Circuit des Ardennes
2012
 3rd Overall Tour de Kumano
 4th Overall Tour of Japan
 9th Overall Tour of Oman
2013
 1st  Overall Tour de Hokkaido
1st  Points classification
1st Stage 2
 4th Overall Tour of Japan
 6th Overall Tour de Kumano
2014
 1st Overall Tour International de Sétif
1st  Mountains classification
 2nd Overall Tour de Constantine
1st Stage 2
 5th Overall Tour of Japan
 5th Circuit d'Alger
 8th Overall Tour de Kumano
 9th Overall Tour de Guadeloupe
1st Stage 4
2015
 1st  Overall Tour de Filipinas
 Tour de Guadeloupe
1st Prologue (TTT) & Stage 6
 6th Overall Tour of Japan
 9th Overall Tour de Kumano
2016
 1st  Mountains classification Tour d'Azerbaïdjan
 3rd Overall Tour de Kumano
 7th Overall Tour de Guadeloupe
 9th Overall Tour of Japan
 10th Overall Tour de Hokkaido
2017
 1st  Overall Tour de Flores
1st Stage 6
 4th Overall Tour de Molvccas
 5th Overall Tour de Hokkaido
 5th Japan Cup
 6th Overall Tour de Lombok
 7th Overall Tour de Korea
 8th Overall Tour de Kumano
1st Stage 2
 8th Overall Tour de Filipinas
 10th Overall Tour of Iran (Azerbaijan)
2018
 2nd Overall Sharjah International Cycling Tour
 3rd Overall Tour of Japan
1st Stage 5
 3rd Overall Tour of Thailand
 3rd Overall Tour de Ijen
 7th Oita Urban Classic
 8th Overall Tour de Langkawi
2019
 1st  Overall Tour de Indonesia
1st  Mountains classification
 1st Stage 2 Tour de Kumano
 3rd Overall Tour of Thailand
 4th Overall Tour de Ijen
1st  Mountains classification
1st Stage 4
 5th Overall New Zealand Cycle Classic
 8th Overall Tour of Peninsular
2020
 8th Overall New Zealand Cycle Classic
 8th Overall Herald Sun Tour
2021
 2nd Overall Tour of Japan
 8th Oita Urban Classic
2022
 2nd Overall Tour de Hokkaido
 3rd Overall Tour of Japan
 3rd Hiroshima Road Race
 7th Overall Tour de Taiwan
 8th Japan Cup

References

External links

 
 

1985 births
Living people
French male cyclists
Sportspeople from Pau, Pyrénées-Atlantiques
Cyclists from Nouvelle-Aquitaine